Great Gate of Kiev, which is also known as one of the Bogatyr Gates of Kiev:
 Golden Gate, Kyiv 11th century gate of Kyiv and 20th century reconstruction as a museum
 Pictures at an Exhibition#10. The Bogatyr Gates (In the Capital in Kiev) musical composition by Mussorgsky, also known as "The Great Gate of Kiev"
 The Wanderer (Holy Blood album)#1. "Bogatyr Gates in Capital Town in Kiev" track on album by Ukrainian folk metal group "Holy Blood"